Sanjeev Sivan is an Indian film director and screenwriter who works in the Malayalam and Hindi film industries. He is best known for directing the 2004 Malayalam film Aparichithan starring Mammootty.

Family
Sanjeev Sivan is the youngest son of national award-winning filmmaker Sivan. His brothers Santosh Sivan and Sangeeth Sivan also work in the film industry.

Career
He started his career as an executive producer of his father's national and state award-winning feature films, namely Johny and Abhayam. In 2004 he directed the movie Aparichithan and in 2014 he directed Venalodungathe starring national award-winning actors Salim Kumar and Seema Biswas in lead roles based on real life incidents. The movie also won an Ammonite Award at the 6th Hidden Gems Film Festival-2014, Calgary, Canada.

After Aparichithan, Sivan directed around 30 short films and 75 documentaries, which earned him international film awards. He has also directed documentaries for the National Geographic Channel, and won an award from the Ecofilms festival 2010 in Greece. He has directed documentaries for Discovery Channel and Al Jazeera.

Sanjeev was a jury member for the 57th National Film Awards and the Indian Documentary Producers Association (IDPA) Film Awards. He is the recipient of Karamveer Puraskar - 2015.

Awards

State awards
As executive producer:

 Johny - won Kerala State Film Award for Best Children's Film 
 Abhayam - won Best Children's Film at the Kerala State Film Awards 
 Keshu - won Best Children's Film at the Kerala State Film Awards

National awards
As executive producer:

 Abhayam - won Best Children's Film at the National Film Awards 
 Abhayam - won Best Children's Film at the Indian Panorama 
 Keshu - won Best Children's Film at the National Film Awards 
 Keshu - won the Indian Panorama for Best Children's Film

Other awards
As director:
 
 Achtung Baby, a film on Indo-Aryan race - selected at the Indian Panorama 
 Conferred "Karamveer Puraskar" for his contribution to Indian cinema and documentary space
 Underground Inferno - won Best Environmental Film at the International Film Festival of India Goa 2010

International awards
As executive producer:

 Oru Yatra Fipresci - award at the Hong Kong International Film Festival 
 Abhayam - won Best Children's Film at the International Children's Film Festival of India 

As director:
 Underground Inferno - won Best Environmental film at Ecofilms Rodos International Films and Visual Arts Festival, Greece 
 Venalodungathe - Ammonite Award at the 6th Hidden Gems Film Festival 2014, Calgary, Canada

Filmography

Feature films

Documentaries

References

Living people
Year of birth missing (living people)
Hindi-language film directors
21st-century Indian film directors
Film directors from Thiruvananthapuram
Malayalam screenwriters
Screenwriters from Thiruvananthapuram
20th-century Indian dramatists and playwrights
21st-century Indian dramatists and playwrights
Malayalam film producers
Hindi film producers